A Nest Unfeathered is a 1914 American drama film featuring Harry Carey.

Cast
 Kate Bruce
 Harry Carey
 Claire McDowell

See also
 Harry Carey filmography

External links

1914 films
American silent short films
American black-and-white films
1914 drama films
1914 short films
Silent American drama films
1910s American films